Carmen Phillips (born Anna Catherine Phillips; September 15, 1888 – December 14, 1966) was an American actress of the silent era. She appeared in more than 60 films between 1914 and 1926, frequently as a "vamp".

Biography

A native Californian, Phillips performed on stage in musical comedies and as a Floradora Girl before films. Her stage name, "Carmen," came from her work as an "operatic contralto."

She died from complications of multiple sclerosis and her ashes are interred at Live Oak Memorial Park in Monrovia, California.

Partial filmography

 The Pipes o' Pan (1914, Short) - Caprice
 Damon and Pythias (1914) - Extra (uncredited)
 Outside the Gates (1915, Short) - Carmela - a Dancing Girl
 Under the Crescent (1915) - Princess Uarda
 The New Adventures of Terence O'Rourke (1915) - Princess Constantine
 Lord John's Journal (1915) - Jenny
 The Grey Sisterhood (1916, Short) - Jenny
 Three Fingered Jenny (1916, Short) - Jenny
 The League of the Future (1916)
 Forbidden Paths (1917) - Benita Ramirez
 The Planter (1917) - Minor Role
 The Sunset Trail (1917) - Camilla Aiken
 Unclaimed Goods (1918) - Idaho Ina
 Tyrant Fear (1918) - Marie Courtot
 The Velvet Hand (1918) - Countess Michhetti
 The Cabaret Girl (1918) - Dolly
 Smiles (1919) - Madame Yelba
 Whitewashed Walls (1919) - Rosa
 The Home Town Girl (1919) - Nan Powderly
 The Man Who Turned White (1919) - Fanina
 The Pagan God (1919) - Tai Chen
 For A Woman's Honor (1919) - Valeska De Marsay
 The Hawk's Trail (1919) - Mimi
 The Great Air Robbery (1919) - Viola Matthews
 The Right of Way (1920) - Paulette Du Bois
 Mrs. Temple's Telegram (1920) - Pauline
 Always Audacious (1920) - Molly the Eel
 The Hope Diamond Mystery (1921) - Wanda Atherton / Miza
 All Soul's Eve (1921) - Olivia Larkin
 Too Much Married (1921) - Mrs. William Trevor
 The Fire Eater (1921) - Marie Roselli
 The Guttersnipe (1922) - Lady Clarissa
 The Heart Specialist (1922) - Grace Fitch
 Thirty Days (1922) - Carlotta
 The Gentleman from America (1923) - The Vamp
 Ashes of Vengeance (1923) - Marie
 Hollywood (1923) - Carmen Phillips
 The Fighting Coward (1924) - Mexico
 Fair Week (1924) - Madame Le Grande
 The Beautiful Sinner (1924) - Carmen De Santas
 A Cafe in Cairo (1924) - Gaza
 The Great Circus Mystery (1925) - Natchi
 A Six Shootin' Romance (1926) - Mrs. King (final film role)

References

External links

 

1888 births
1936 deaths
American film actresses
American silent film actresses
20th-century American actresses
American musical theatre actresses
Deaths from multiple sclerosis
Neurological disease deaths in California